Pierre-Eugène-Émile Hébert (October 12 or 20, 1823 – 1893) was a French sculptor. As the son of sculptor Pierre Hébert, he studied both with his father and with Jean-Jacques Feuchère (1807–1852). Émile Hébert participated in the Salon de Paris and the Exposition Universelle (1855), created the allegorical statues La Comédie and Le Drame for the vaudeville theatre in Paris, and was awarded a Second Class Medal in 1872. Émile Hébert was one of the few sculptors to work with the renowned bronze fondeur Georges Servant, and their artistic collaboration resulted in pieces of the Neo-Grecian and Egyptian Revival style.

Selected works 

 Jeune fille sauvant une abeille, 1855
 Méphistophélès, bronze, Stanford University, 1855
 L'Amour suppliant, 1859
 Amazone se préparant à la bataille, bronze, National Gallery of Art, Washington, 1860
 Et toujours !! Et jamais !!, Collection Joey and Toby Tanenbaum, Toronto, Canada, 1863
 Bacchus, 1866
 La Pologne, medallion, 1867
 M. Servant, bust, 1867
 Bas-reliefs du monument à L'Amiral Duperré, La Rochelle, 1868
 Œdipe, 1869
 L'Oracle, marble bas-relief, 1872
 Bellérophon vainqueur de la Chimère, 1874
 Sémiramis, reine d'Assyrie, bust, 1874
 Alexandre Tessier, propagateur du moutons mérinos, bronze bust, 1876
 Buste de Balzac, High Museum of Art, Atlanta, 1877
 Table de style néo-grec, Musée d'Orsay, Paris, c. 1878
 Rabelais, Chinon, 1882
 L'Oracle, bas-relief, 1893

References

External links
 
 Pierre-Eugène-Emile Hébert, Dictionnaire général de biographie contemporaine française et étrangère, Adolphe Louis Émile Bitard, M. Dreyfous, page 642, 1878.
 National Gallery of Art

1823 births
1893 deaths
19th-century French sculptors
French male sculptors
19th-century French male artists